Valeriya I. Gansvind (also spelled Valeria, born 22 November 1965 in Moscow Oblast) is an Estonian chess player who holds the title of Woman FIDE Master (WFM).

Biography
Gansvind learned to play chess at age eleven. In 1983 she graduated from Moscow boarding sports school. In chess competitions she played for Estonia because her mother is from Tartu.
In the Estonian Women's Chess Championship, Gansvind has won 2 gold (2006, 2009) and 2 silver medals (2005, 2008).

She played for Estonia in Chess Olympiads:
 In 2006, at third board in the 37th Chess Olympiad in Turin (+3 −3 =5);
 In 2008, at second board in the 38th Chess Olympiad in Dresden (+6 −1 =4);
 In 2010, at second board in the 39th Chess Olympiad in Khanty-Mansiysk (+3 −4 =4).

Gansvind worked as a chess coach. She lives in Moscow and Canada, taking part in there a chess tournaments. Her husbund is chess grandmaster Sergey Kalinitschew.
Valeriya's son Andrey Kalinichev is FIDE Master (FM) and has won Estonian Chess Championship silver medal in 2005.

References

External links
 
 
 

1965 births
Living people
Estonian female chess players
Soviet female chess players
Chess Woman FIDE Masters
Sportspeople from Moscow Oblast